Konstantinos Kypriotis (8 January 1954 – 27 December 1995) was a Greek Martial Artist who was internationally known for his achievements in Tang Soo Do. His first taste of martial arts came in 1968 at the age of 14 as a student at the German-Korean association of martial arts with instructor Mr. M Theodoridis.

In 1969 he continued as a student in Taekwondo with Instructor Mr. Stamatis Kassis until 1972 when he graduated from the six form private high school of St Paul and was successful in being accepted at Panteio University of Athens. He preferred to study abroad, though, and in 1973 was accepted into the Salzburg University law school in Austria where he studied until 1976. During this period he trained in Taekwondo under instructor Kim Kang Un.

In 1975 he achieved a black belt in Taekwondo with instructor Kim Kyong Myong at Tae Kwon Do studio Salzburg Austria.

In 1976 he was forced to suspend his studies and return to Greece for family reasons.
In 1983 he had his first connection with Tang Soo Do under Kim Hong Lee.
In 1984 he continued with instructor Lee Kun Hwa.

In 1985 he became a Greek representative of World Tang Soo Do Association under the guidance of Shin Jae-chul and a black belt in Tang Soo Do.
From 1983 to 1986 he owned a studio in the city of Piraeus and in 1986 he married Mrs. Maria Sini who also trained in Tang Soo Do. In 1986 he obtained the 2nd Dan in Tang Soo Do and the 3rd Dan in 1989.

In 1992 he left the World Tang Soo Do Association and formed "Traditional Tang Soo Do". In the same year, he was awarded with the title of Master - 4th Dan in Tang Soo Do by Yi Sang Yong, a 7th Dan Korean Instructor. 
Over the years, Konstantinos Kypriotis developed his art continuously until December 27, 1995 when he was suddenly killed in a motoring accident.

Achievements 
1988, World Championship W.T.S.D.A. USA Philadelphia: 1st Place Hyungs
1988, European Championship W.T.S.D.A. England: 1st Place Hyungs
1989, European Championship W.T.S.D.A. Holland: 1st Place Hyungs
1991, European Championship W.T.S.D.A. Germany: 1st Place Hyungs

Greek male taekwondo practitioners
1954 births
1995 deaths